Kızın Varmı Derdin Var is a 1973 Turkish film, directed by Halit Refiğ and starring Ayhan Işık, Perihan Savaş and Öztoprak Ünsal.

References

1973 films
Turkish comedy-drama films
Films directed by Halit Refiğ